Chong Wei Feng (born 26 May 1987) is a Malaysian retired badminton player. He was drafted into the national team in 2004. His best achievement is reaching the semi-finals of the 2012 and 2013 China Open, where he was defeated by Chen Long on both occasions.

Background 
Chong was born on 26 May 1987 in Sungai Petani, Kedah. Chong started playing badminton at the age of nine, where he went to a private coaching centre. Chong was drafted into the national team through Badminton Association of Malaysia annual selections in 2004. On 29 March 2016, Chong announced his resignation from BAM effective 1 May 2016.

Achievements

Asian Championships 
Men's singles

Southeast Asian Games 
Men's singles

BWF Grand Prix 
The BWF Grand Prix had two levels, the Grand Prix and Grand Prix Gold. It was a series of badminton tournaments sanctioned by the Badminton World Federation (BWF) and played between 2007 and 2017.

Men's singles

  BWF Grand Prix Gold tournament
  BWF Grand Prix tournament

BWF International Challenge/Series 
Men's singles

  BWF International Challenge tournament
  BWF International Series tournament

References

External links 
 
 
 

1987 births
Living people
People from Kedah
Malaysian sportspeople of Chinese descent
Malaysian male badminton players
Badminton players at the 2014 Commonwealth Games
Commonwealth Games gold medallists for Malaysia
Commonwealth Games medallists in badminton
Badminton players at the 2014 Asian Games
Asian Games bronze medalists for Malaysia
Asian Games medalists in badminton
Medalists at the 2014 Asian Games
Competitors at the 2011 Southeast Asian Games
Competitors at the 2013 Southeast Asian Games
Competitors at the 2015 Southeast Asian Games
Southeast Asian Games gold medalists for Malaysia
Southeast Asian Games silver medalists for Malaysia
Southeast Asian Games bronze medalists for Malaysia
Southeast Asian Games medalists in badminton
Medallists at the 2014 Commonwealth Games